Feroze Varun Gandhi or Varun Gandhi  (born 13 March 1980) is an Indian politician and a third-term member of Parliament for Lok Sabha from the Pilibhit constituency. He is a member of the Bharatiya Janata Party and was inducted into Rajnath Singh's team in March 2012 as General Secretary. He belongs to the Nehru–Gandhi family, which has occupied a prominent place in the politics of India since a time before the country's independence in 1947.

Early life and education 
Feroze Varun Gandhi was born in Delhi on 13 March 1980 to Sanjay Gandhi and Maneka Gandhi. He is the grandson of former Prime Minister of India, Indira Gandhi and the great-grandson of India's first Prime Minister, Jawaharlal Nehru. Varun was born soon after Indira Gandhi regained power in the 1980 general election. Sanjay Gandhi died in a plane crash when Varun was three months old in June 1980. Indira was assassinated when Varun was four years old on 31 October 1984. Varun attended Rishi Valley School and the British School, New Delhi, where he ran for a position on the student council. He received B.Sc.(hon) from University of London.

Early political career 
Varun Gandhi was first introduced to the Pilibhit constituency by his mother during the 1999 election campaigning. Maneka had been a part of the National Democratic Alliance (NDA) since earlier but she and Varun formally joined BJP in 2004. Varun Gandhi campaigned for the party in the 2004 elections, covering over 40 constituencies.

In an interview to Stephen Sackur on BBC's HARDTalk in October 2005, Gandhi answered questions about the reasons behind his political affiliation and defended his father as someone who had helped revive the industrialisation of India by starting Maruti Udyog and whose strategy helped the Congress party's comeback after the first ever non-Congress Janata Party government following an electoral routing for the Indira Gandhi-government after Emergency, among many other things.

As a Member of Parliament 
In the 2009 general election, the BJP decided to field Varun Gandhi as its candidate from the Pilibhit constituency instead of his mother Maneka Gandhi. He won the seat by receiving 419,539 votes and defeated his nearest contending candidate, V.M. Singh, by a margin of 281,501 votes. The victory was the strongest of any of the four Gandhi family candidates in the election: his mother Maneka Gandhi, aunt Sonia Gandhi and first cousin Rahul Gandhi. The security deposits of all other candidates, including those of V.M. Singh of the Indian National Congress and the Bahujan Samaj Party candidate Ganga Charan Rajput were forfeited. A case was filed against Gandhi for allegedly making a provocative speech about Muslims, at a meeting at Dalchand Mohalla area of Pilibhit; however, he was acquitted by in court in the matter. On 5 March 2013, a Pilibhit court acquitted Gandhi in the second hate speech case registered against him during the 2009 Lok Sabha election campaign.

In March 2013, Rajnath Singh appointed Varun Gandhi as the national general secretary of the BJP. He became the youngest ever general secretary of the party. In May 2013, Varun Gandhi was made in charge of the BJP's affairs in West Bengal. In June 2013, Gandhi requested Lok Sabha Speaker Meira Kumar to call an emergency all party meeting in view of the calamity in Uttarakhand in which thousands of people had died. He suggested a number of step like contribution from MPLADs fund, forgoing of three months' salary by MPs and tax incentives for corporate and individuals for help. He has said that he spoke to many MPs and all of them were ready to contribute. He said that the Speaker should act as a catalyst and coordinate the action plan.

In July 2013, Gandhi handed over a cheque of Rs 1 lakh from his salary account to family members of former Jan Sangh Member of Legislative Assembly late Bhagwati Prasad, who died at a government hospital after prolonged illness and age-related complications. The former MLA had to spend over an hour on the floor of an emergency ward before doctors at the hospital realised he was an ex-MLA and was subsequently given medical attention. His family didn't even have money to perform the last rites after his death. Varun said he learned about Prasad only after his death. Describing the late MLA as a model of honesty, he said it was hard to find an honest leader like him.

In August 2013, newspapers reported that Gandhi was the only MP in the country who had spent all of his MP Local Area Development Fund (MPLAD) before stipulated time. According to official sources, Varun Gandhi used his funds for the development in education, health and infrastructure activities. His proposals were worth more than the entire MPLAD fund thus ensuring the entire amount of 25 crore was spent during his tenure as a Member of Parliament. His political aides stated that he submitted the proposals on time and also employed his personal team to monitor the use of money.

In September 2013, Varun Gandhi accused the Samajwadi Party-led Uttar Pradesh government of pursuing the politics of appeasement, and said that its mistakes would lead to its collapse, after it denied permission to Varun Gandhi's rally in Agra just two days before it was scheduled to take place.

He denounced Rahul Gandhi's infamous outburst against the controversial ordinance against convicted lawmakers, and said that it was an insult to the Prime Minister, who was abroad at the time, and therefore also disgraceful to the nation. He also said that if the Prime Minister had any dignity left, he should resign immediately upon his return to the country, on the day of Rahul Gandhi's outburst.

In February 2014, Gandhi kickstarted his campaign for the  2014 election in Sultanpur. He gave an emotional speech to an enthusiastic crowd in Kadipur, and said that he had come to Sultanpur to fulfill his father's dreams.

In May 2014, Gandhi defeated Amita Singh from Sultanpur in Lok Sabha 2014 elections.

In March 2016, he introduced the Representation of the People (Amendment) Bill, 2016 in Lok Sabha.

He contested from Pilibhit lok sabha constituency in 2019 general elections and won with approx 250,000 votes to become an MP for the third consecutive time.

Jan Lokpal Bill
In August 2011, Varun Gandhi strongly pitched for the Jan Lokpal Bill. Gandhi offered his official residence to activist Anna Hazare to hold his fast, after Hazare was denied permission by the government. When Hazare was jailed, Gandhi offered to table the Jan Lokpal Bill in Parliament. On 24 August, he went to Ramlila Maidan as a common man to support the cause of Anna Hazare, becoming the first politician to openly support the anti-corruption cause.

Columnist
Gandhi writes articles and policy papers for several national dailies and magazines in India, such as The Times of India, Hindustan Times, The Economic Times, The Indian Express, The Asian Age, The Hindu, Outlook among others. Gandhi writes the largest syndicated column in the country covering 21 newspapers—including Malayala Manorama, Lokmat, Rajasthan Patrika, Punjab Kesari, Amar Ujala, Sandesh, Bartaman, Sakshi—reaching more than 200 million readers.

Writings
Gandhi wrote his first volume of poems, titled The Otherness of Self, at the age of 20, in 2000. His second volume of poems, titled Stillness was published by HarperCollins in April 2015. The book became the bestselling non-fiction book, selling over 10,000 copies in the first two days of its release.

In 2018, he released his book on the Indian rural economy titled The Rural Manifesto: Realising India's Future Through Her Villages. The book sold over 30,000 copies in ten days of its release.

See also
List of political families
Maneka Gandhi
List of Indian writers

References

External links
 Profile at Lok Sabha, Parliament of India

1980 births
Living people
Alumni of University of London Worldwide
Alumni of the University of London
Bharatiya Janata Party politicians from Uttar Pradesh
Nehru–Gandhi family
People from New Delhi
People from Pilibhit
Activists from Uttar Pradesh
Indian Hindus
Punjabi people
Parsi people
Kashmiri people
India MPs 2009–2014
Politicians from Kolkata
Lok Sabha members from Uttar Pradesh
India MPs 2014–2019
People from Sultanpur district
India MPs 2019–present
National Democratic Alliance candidates in the 2019 Indian general election